(stylized in all-lowercase) is a Japanese singer. She is known for her viral cover single "Bad Apple!!" which she released with Alstroemeria Records in 2007. She is signed to the Lantis record label, and has released works which have been used in both anime and visual novels.

Career 
Nomico debuted in 2004 as the lead singer of the musical circle LOOPCUBE. They released their debut album, entitled  in 2004. 

In 2006, she left LOOPCUBE to pursue a solo career; her debut single, "Shichaimashou" was used as the ending theme in the anime Renkin 3-kyū Magical? Pokān, in which she also acted, providing the voices of Keimi, an invisible woman who serves as a chaperone of the protagonists, and Jun, a talking rabbit. She released her solo debut album, Nomico no Mi in 2006. 

Nomico has sung "Koisora Recycling" for Akikan!, "Skip!" for Moetan, "Randoseling" for Mitsudomoe Zouryouchuu!, "Karakuri Nemuri Dan" for Katanagatari, "Hoshikaze no Horoscope" for Hoshizora e Kakaru Hashi. 

Although she has worked extensively in the visual novel and song cover scenes, nomico is known for her single "Bad Apple!!" which was a collaboration with Alstroemeria Records. Released in 2007, the song went viral both on YouTube and Nico Nico Douga, and spawned a massive number of remixes and fanworks. As of March 2022, the music video has gained over 68 million views on YouTube. The song also charted on Nico Nico Douga's rankings around the time of its release.

Filmography

Discography

Studio albums

Singles 

 "Bad Apple!!" (with Alstroemeria Records)
 "Hoshikaze no Horoscope"
 "Karakuri Nemuri Dan"
 "Koikora Recycling"
 "Randoseling"
 "Shichaimashou"

References

External links 
 
 

Year of birth missing (living people)
Living people
Japanese women singers